Seduction is a play by Jack Heifner.  It is an all male, gay adaptation of the 1897 play La Ronde (or Reigen) by Arthur Schnitzler.

The encounters closely follow those of Schnitzler's play, with the following sequence:
 The Sex Worker and the Sailor
 The Sailor and the Gardner (the Parlor Maid, originally the third partner in La Ronde, has her day off)
 The Gardner and the Young Gentleman 
 The Young Gentleman and the Professor
 The Professor and His Partner
 The Partner and the Dim-Witted Teen
 The Dim-Witted Teen and the Playwright
 The Playwright and the Actor
 The Actor and the Movie Producer
 The Movie Producer and the Sex Worker

2004 plays
Gay male literature
LGBT-related plays
British plays